Elections to the Supreme Soviet of the Estonian SSR were held on 19 March 1967. The Bloc of Communists and Non-Party Candidates was the only party able to contest the elections, and won all 178 seats.

Results

See also
List of members of the Supreme Soviet of the Estonian Soviet Socialist Republic, 1967–1971

References

Estonia
Single-candidate elections
One-party elections
1967 in Estonia
Parliamentary elections in Estonia
Estonian Soviet Socialist Republic
Election and referendum articles with incomplete results